Candalides acasta, the blotched blue, is a species of butterfly of the family Lycaenidae. It is found in southern Australia, including Queensland, New South Wales, Victoria, Tasmania, South Australia and Western Australia.

The wingspan is about 20 mm. Adults are brown with a blue sheen. The underside is fawn with brown shading and rows of dark dashes.

The larvae have been recorded feeding inside the flower buds of Cassytha species, including Cassytha glabella, Cassytha filiformis, Cassytha peninsularis and Cassytha pubescens. They are green with yellow lines. The pupa is narrow and brown with a few black spots.

References

Candalidini
Butterflies described in 1873
Butterflies of Australia